Elymnias kuenstleri is a butterfly in the family Nymphalidae. It was described by Eduard Honrath in 1885. It is found in the Indomalayan realm.

Subspecies
E. k. kuenstleri — Peninsular Malaysia
E. k. rileyi Corbet, 1933 — Borneo
E. k. gauroides Fruhstorfer, 1894 — Java
E. k. dohrnii de Nicéville, 1895 — North Sumatra: Bohorok

References

External links
"Elymnias Hübner, 1818" at Markku Savela's Lepidoptera and Some Other Life Forms

Elymnias
Butterflies described in 1885